Vira is a village in Anjar Taluka in Kutch district of Gujarat, India. Nearby temple of Jogninar is place of religious significance.

History
Vira belongs to the descendants of a Jain priest, who, when he was still a fugitive, foretold greatness of Rao Khengarji of Cutch State (1537).

Places of interest

Jogninar temple is dedicated to 64 Jogni and reservoir, said to be built around 1478, but rebuilt in 1853, a popular place for performing ceremonies for the dead.

There is also, about 350 years old, a small stone plastered tomb of a Sind Syed.

References

 This article incorporates Public Domain text from 

Villages in Kutch district